The Cabinet of David Toro constituted the 97th national cabinet of the Republic of Bolivia. It was a component of the Government Junta led by President David Toro and was in office from 17 May 1936 to 13 July 1937.

The cabinet was formed after the armed forces ousted President José Luis Tejada Sorzano in a coup d'état which brought a civil-military junta to power. For the first five days of its existence, the cabinet and the junta were chaired by Lieutenant Colonel Germán Busch until the arrival of Toro on 22 May. It was dissolved when Toro was deposed in another coup d'état led by Busch, though the junta Toro chaired remained in power.

Cabinet Ministers

Composition 
The majority of Toro's cabinet consisted of military personnel, particularly members of the young officer corps. Of these, were the four lieutenant colonels Julio Viera (Government and Justice), Jorge Jórdan (Industry and Commerce), Antenor Ichazo (Mining and Petrol), and Luis Añez Rodríguez (Agriculture, Colonization, and Immigration). Other members of the military included Major Raul Tovar (Education and Indigenous Affairs), and Colonel Oscar Moscoso (National Defense). This is not to mention lieutenant colonel Germán Busch, who served as provisional president of the junta until 22 May, as well as David Toro himself, who has a colonel.

Leftist political and social movements were represented by Enrique Baldivieso, one of the founders and leader of the United Socialist Party (PSU). Organized labor was represented by Waldo Álvarez, a key figure in the debilitating general strikes which set the stage for the stage for the coup. Álvarez had been elected as a delegate to the junta by an assembly of the Workers Federation of Labor (FOT) and the Local Workers Federation (FOL).

The composition of the cabinet was also significantly restructured, elevating the number of ministries to ten. Four of these were the offices of Statistics, Immigration, Commerce, and Indigenous Affairs. In addition, the Office of Propaganda was established as a component of the Foreign Ministry in late 1936. Furthermore, the Ministry of Mining and Petrol was formed on 22 May, foreshadowing a more active involvement by the Bolivian government in the exploitation of its natural resources which would eventually lead to the nationalization of Standard Oil in March 1937. Finally, the Ministry of Work and Social Security was established on 22 May under the leadership of unionist Waldo Álvarez. However, Álvarez would resign in early 1937 following the issuance of an "anti-communist" decree by Toro which led to the arrest of numerous senior officials. A second assembly of the FOT and FOL would elect Javier Paz Campero of the PSU to replace Álvarez.

On 13 July 1937, dissatisfied with what he viewed as unending political compromise and pragmatism, Germán Busch forced the resignation of David Toro. Busch was transmitted control of the junta, becoming de facto president. Many of the ministers in Toro's cabinet would remain in Busch's.

Structural changes

Gallery

Notes

References

Bibliography 

 

Cabinets of Bolivia
Cabinets established in 1936
Cabinets disestablished in 1937
1936 establishments in Bolivia